Nasino is a comune (municipality) in the province of Savona in the Italian region Liguria, located about  southwest of Genoa and about  southwest of Savona.

Nasino borders the following municipalities: Alto, Aquila di Arroscia, Castelbianco, Erli, Garessio, Onzo, Ormea, and Ranzo.

References

Cities and towns in Liguria